Jat Chuen, previously Jat Min, is one of the 41 constituencies in the Sha Tin District in Hong Kong.

The constituency returns one district councillor to the Sha Tin District Council, with an election every four years.

The Jat Chuen constituency is loosely based on Jat Min Chuen, Shui Chuen O Estate, Tsok Pok Hang San Tsuen and Shan Ha Wai, with an estimated population of 19,634.

Councillors represented

Election results

2010s

2000s

1990s

References

Sha Tin Wai
Constituencies of Hong Kong
Constituencies of Sha Tin District Council
1994 establishments in Hong Kong
Constituencies established in 1994